Musical Bones is a studio album by Vin Gordon and The Upsetters, produced by Lee Perry and released in 1975. It was first released as a white label record.

Track listing
"Coco-Macca"
"Fly Away"
"The Message"
"Licky-Licky"
"Labrish"
"Quinge-Up"
"Raw-Chaw"
"5 Cardiff Crescent"
"Four of a Kind"
"Voodoo Man"

Personnel
Backing Band : The Upsetters
Drums : Mikey "Boo" Richards, Anthony "Ben Bow" Creary
Bass : Boris Gardiner
Lead Guitar : Earl "Chinna" Smith, Geoffrey Chung
Organ : Winston Wright
Horns : Bobby Ellis, Dirty Harry
Trombone : Vin Gordon
Percussions : Skully, Lee Perry

References

The Upsetters albums
1975 albums
Albums produced by Lee "Scratch" Perry